João Rafael Kapango (born 14 September 1975 in Maputo) is a Mozambican football goalkeeper.

International career
He is an international football player and played the 2010 Africa Cup of Nations in Angola.

He became notable in the 2010 African Cup of Nations during the game against Benin, when he came to collect a routine overhit pass and made a bizarre attempt at a salto whilst gathering the ball. Whilst he narrowly avoided conceding a goal, he injured his neck in the process. The incident has become a minor YouTube hit.

References

https://www.youtube.com/watch?v=UFZ7YH41Lk0

1975 births
Living people
Sportspeople from Maputo
Mozambican footballers
Mozambique international footballers
Clube Ferroviário de Maputo footballers
Tersana SC players
Expatriate footballers in Egypt
2010 Africa Cup of Nations players
Association football goalkeepers